Bun Fun is a video game written by A.J. Turner for the BBC Micro home computer and published by Squirrel Software on cassette in 1983 It was later ported to the Acorn Electron.

Gameplay
In the game, the player manages a production line. A number of buns sit on a conveyor belt and, by rhythmic tapping of two keys on the computer, the player decorates them with icing, sugar and walnuts to produce a 'gudbun'. The more gudbuns the player produces, the more wages that player earns.

References

External links

 Review of Bun Fun by the Electron User Group

1983 video games
BBC Micro and Acorn Electron games
BBC Micro and Acorn Electron-only games
Video games developed in the United Kingdom
Action video games